The 2018 Bangkok Challenger II was a professional tennis tournament played on hard courts. It was third edition of the tournament and part of the 2018 ATP Challenger Tour. It took place in Bangkok, Thailand between 8 and 13 January 2018.

Singles main-draw entrants

Seeds

 1 Rankings are as of 1 January 2018.

Other entrants
The following players received wildcards into the singles main draw:
  Thanapet Chanta
  Congsup Congcar
  Pruchya Isaro
  Pol Wattanakul

The following player received entry into the singles main draw using a protected ranking:
  Flavio Cipolla
 
The following players received entry from the qualifying draw:
  Yuya Kibi
  Frederik Nielsen
  Sidharth Rawat
  Emil Ruusuvuori

Champions

Singles

  Marcel Granollers def.  Enrique López Pérez  4–6, 6–2, 6–0.

Doubles

   James Cerretani /  Joe Salisbury def.  Enrique López Pérez /  Pedro Martínez 6–7(5–7), 6–3, [10–8].

References

 
 ATP Challenger Tour
Tennis, ATP Challenger Tour, Bangkok Challenger II
Tennis, ATP Challenger Tour, Bangkok Challenger II

Tennis, ATP Challenger Tour, Bangkok Challenger II